Jean-Baptiste Dubois de Jancigny (21 May 1753 – 1 April 1808) was a French agronomist and scientist.

1753 births
1808 deaths
French agronomists
18th-century French scientists
Members of the Prussian Academy of Sciences